Bossy may refer to:

People
Fabien Bossy (born 1977), French football defender
George Bossy (1927–2012), Canadian sprint canoeist
John Bossy (1933–2015), British historian
Marcos Bossy (1920–1987), Swiss basketball player
Maurice Bossy (1929–2008), Canadian politician
Mike Bossy (1957–2022), Canadian ice hockey player
Raoul Bossy (1895–1975), Romanian diplomat

Other uses
"Bossy" (Kelis song), 2006
"Bossy" (Lindsay Lohan song), 2008
Bossy (Neighbours), a fictional dog from the Australian soap opera Neighbours
A common name for cattle

See also
Little Miss Bossy, a book
Bossi (disambiguation)